The Natural is the debut studio album by American rapper Mic Geronimo. It was released on October 17, 1995, via Blunt Recordings/TVT Records. Production was handled by Mark Sparks, Buckwild, Irv Gotti, Da Beatminerz and Chyskillz. It features guest appearances from Royal Flush, Murder Inc., O.C. and the Lost Boyz. It peaked at number 144 on the Billboard 200. The album spawned four singles: "Shit's Real", "Masta I.C.", "The Natural" and "Wherever You Are".

Track listing 

Sample credits
Track 3 contains elements of "Night Crawler" by Bob James.

Charts

References

External links

1995 debut albums
Mic Geronimo albums
Albums produced by Buckwild
Albums produced by Irv Gotti
Albums produced by Mark Sparks
Albums produced by Da Beatminerz
TVT Records albums